Richard Paul Anderson (born February 10, 1946) is an American former professional football player who was a safety for the Miami Dolphins of the American Football League (AFL) and National Football League (NFL) for nine seasons during the 1960s and 1970s.  He played college football at Colorado and was recognized as a consensus All-American.  He was selected in third round of the 1968 NFL/AFL draft, and he played for his entire professional career for the Dolphins.

Despite numerous accolades, an NFL record with 4 interceptions in a game, Dick Anderson has yet to make the Hall of Fame. It’s possibly due to his short tenure, only playing 10 seasons.

Career
Anderson was named a consensus first-team All-American in his senior season at the University of Colorado, and set a school record with 14 career interceptions . Anderson was selected by the Dolphins in the 1968 NFL/AFL Draft, and was named the AFL defensive rookie of the year. He was a three-time Pro Bowler in 1972, 1973 (in which he was NFL Defensive Player of the Year), and 1974, in which he was one of the leaders of the Dolphins well known No Name Defense. Anderson was also the president of the National Football League Players Association from 1975 until he retired.

Although primarily a safety, he also served as the team's backup punter.  In 1969 Miami's regular punter separated his shoulder late in the season and Anderson took over the punting duties for the Dolphins' last game of the season against the New York Jets. In Miami's undefeated season of 1972, Seiple injured his knee in a late season game against the Jets and Anderson had to punt late in that game.  The Dolphins signed punter Billy Lothridge, who punted the next two games, but the Dolphins had to deactivate Lothridge for their next to last game against the New York Giants in order to activate quarterback Bob Griese, who had missed much of the season with an injury, and so Anderson had to take over the punting duties for that game.  Seiple returned for the Dolphins' last game of the season and for the playoffs.

In his nine AFL/NFL seasons, Anderson recorded 34 interceptions, which he returned for 792 yards and 3 touchdowns.  He also recovered 15 fumbles, returning them for 100 yards and a touchdown.  On special teams, he gained 430 yards returning kickoffs and punted the ball nine times for 335 yards.

After retirement, Anderson became a successful businessman and a Florida state senator.  In 1993, he was enshrined in the College Football Hall of Fame. His brother is Bobby Anderson, an All-American running back at Colorado and the eleventh overall pick of the 1970 NFL Draft, selected by the Denver Broncos. His son, Blake Anderson, played wide receiver for the University of Colorado.

On December 3, 1973, Anderson had perhaps his greatest personal effort in his career, becoming the 7th player to intercept 4 passes in a single game in NFL history in the Dolphins 30-26 victory over the Pittsburgh Steelers.  Since that date, another six players have tied that mark.

On December 3, 2006, Anderson was inducted into the Miami Dolphins Honor Roll during halftime of the Dolphins-Jaguars game. He is one of two players inducted that year, the other being Richmond Webb, who was inducted December 25 against the Jets. Anderson was the first individual defensive back inducted into the Honor Roll. The entire 1972 Dolphins roster is a part of the Honor Roll, including Anderson.

In 2018, the Professional Football Researchers Association named Anderson to the PFRA Hall of Very Good Class of 2018. He is noted for being one of four players from the NFL All-Decade team from the 1970s to not eventually have been inducted into the Pro Football Hall of Fame.

Career Statistics

Regular Season

Celebrity golf
Anderson has competed at the American Century Championship, an annual golf competition to determine the best players among American sports and entertainment celebrities. He won the tournament in 1994 and has a total of 11 top ten finishes. The tournament, televised by NBC in July, is played at Edgewood Tahoe Golf Course in Lake Tahoe, Nevada.

See also
 List of American Football League players

References

External links
 

1946 births
Living people
All-American college football players
American Conference Pro Bowl players
American football safeties
Boulder High School alumni
College Football Hall of Fame inductees
Colorado Buffaloes football players
Florida state senators
Miami Dolphins players
Sportspeople from Midland, Michigan
Presidents of the National Football League Players Association
American Football League players
Trade unionists from Florida
National Football League Defensive Player of the Year Award winners